Rehana Maryam Noor is a 2021 Bangladeshi film. The film is directed by Abdullah Mohammad Saad and produced by Jeremy Chua under the banner of Metro Video and co-produced by Sensemakers Productions. The film is about the struggling life of a 37-year-old assistant professor of a medical college. It was internationally distributed by German-based sales and distribution company Films Boutique. In 2021, it was selected in the Un Certain Regard section at the 2021 Cannes Film Festival. It is the first  Bangladeshi film to be featured in this category. It was selected as the Bangladeshi entry for the Best International Feature Film at the 94th Academy Awards. Rehana Maryam Noor bagged two awards at Asia Pacific Screen Awards. The director of the film Abdullah Mohammad Saad bagged the Jury Grand Prize and actress Azmeri Haque Badhon bagged award in Best Performance by an Actress category.

Plot 
The screenplay of the film is based on Rehana Maryam Noor, a 37-year-old teacher of a private medical college, where Rehana is accustomed to living a difficult life as a mother, daughter, sister, and teacher. She witnessed an unexpected incident while leaving college one evening. Since then, she has spoken out on behalf of her medical college student against another fellow teacher in protest of the incident. And when she went to protest, she gradually became stubborn. Later, at the same time, the school authorities mistreated Rehana's 6-year-old daughter. In such a situation, Rehana continued to seek justice for her child and that student from outside the so-called rules of the school.

Cast 
 Azmeri Haque Badhon
 Afia Jahin Jaima
 Kazi Sami Hasan
 Afia Tabassum Borno
 Yasir Al Haq
 Saberi Alam

Release and reception
Rehana Mariam Noor premiered in the Un Certain Regard section at the 2021 Cannes Film Festival and received a standing ovation. It has created a positive buzz among the audience and the critics. The Hollywood Reporter described Rehana Mariam Noor on the bottom line of the review as "a tightly woven psychological portrait bound to incite controversy". The Screen Daily wrote in their review: "the film derives a magnetic continuity, and an unsettling range of dynamics, from Haque Badhon’s performance". The film has been selected for the Debate section of the 65th British Film Institute of London Film Festival. This much anticipated film ‘Rehana Maryam Noor’ has been set to release in 12 cinema halls across Bangladesh on November 12. OTT platform Chorki released this film worldwide on 30 December, 2021. Actress Azmeri Haque Badhon won the Hong Kong Asian Film Festival (HKAFF) award in the New Talent category for her performance in this film.

Awards

See also
 Matir Moyna
 List of submissions to the 94th Academy Awards for Best International Feature Film
 List of Bangladeshi submissions for the Academy Award for Best International Feature Film

References

External links
 

2021 films
Bengali-language Bangladeshi films
2020s Bengali-language films
2021 drama films